Yves Hemedinger (born 23 October 1965) is a French Republican politician was elected Member of Parliament for Haut-Rhin's 1st constituency in a 2020 by-election.

In the 2022 French legislative election, he lost his seat to former minister Brigitte Klinkert.

References 

Living people
1965 births
21st-century French politicians
The Republicans (France) politicians
Deputies of the 15th National Assembly of the French Fifth Republic

People from Haut-Rhin